The National Football League (NFL) playoffs are a single-elimination tournament held after the regular season to determine the NFL champion. Currently, seven teams from each of the league's two conferences qualify for the playoffs. A tie-breaking procedure exists if required. The tournament culminates in the Super Bowl: the league's championship game in which two teams, one from each conference, play each other to become champion of the NFL.

NFL postseason history can be traced to the first NFL Championship Game in 1933, though in the early years, qualification for the game was based solely on regular-season records. From 1933 to 1966, the NFL postseason generally only consisted of the NFL Championship Game, which pitted the league's two division winners against each other (pending any one-game playoff matches that needed to be held to break ties in the division standings). In , the playoffs were expanded to four teams (division winners).

Among the four major professional sports leagues in the United States, the NFL postseason is the only one to use a single-elimination tournament in all of its rounds. Major League Baseball (MLB) has traditionally used "best-of" series formats, though its Wild Card postseason round, initiated in 2012, was a single game until 2022, when it was replaced with a best-of-three series. Both the National Basketball Association (NBA) and the National Hockey League (NHL) continue to use "best-of" series formats.

Current playoff system

The 32-team National Football League is divided into two conferences, the American Football Conference (AFC) and the National Football Conference (NFC). Since 2002, each conference has 16 teams and are further divided into four geographic divisions of four teams each. As of 2020, qualification into the playoffs works as follows:

 The four division champions from each conference (the team in each division with the best overall record) are seeded 1 through 4 based on their overall won-lost-tied record.
 Three wild-card qualifiers from each conference (the three teams with the best overall record of all remaining teams in the conference) are seeded 5, 6, and 7.

If teams are tied (having the same regular season won-lost-tied record), the playoff seeding is determined by a set of tie-breaking rules.

The names of the first two playoff rounds date back to the postseason format that was first used in 1978, when the league added a second wild-card team to each conference. The first round of the playoffs is dubbed the wild-card round (or super wild-card weekend). In this round, the second-seeded division winner hosts the seventh-seeded wild-card, the third hosts the sixth, and the fourth hosts the fifth. There are no restrictions regarding teams from the same division matching up in any round. The division winner with the best record from each conference receives a first round bye, automatically advancing them to the second round, dubbed the divisional round and hosts the lowest-remaining seed from the first round. The other two winners from the wild-card round play each other with the higher seeds hosting. The two surviving teams from each conference's divisional-round playoff games then meet in the respective AFC and NFC Conference Championship games, hosted by the higher-seeded team. The winners of those contests go on to face one another in the Super Bowl which is played at a pre-determined neutral site.

The New York Giants and New York Jets have shared the same home stadium since 1984 (Giants Stadium from 1984 to 2009, and MetLife Stadium since 2010). Thus, if both teams need to host playoff games on the same weekend, they are required to play on separate days, even during the Conference Championship round when both games are normally scheduled the same day. The only time such a scheduling conflict has occurred was during Wild Card weekend in 1985, when only 10 teams qualified for the postseason and there were only two wild-card games. Instead of playing both Wild Card games on the same day, as was the case when the 10-team system was used from 1978 to 1989, the Jets hosted their game Saturday, December 28, before the Giants hosted their game on Sunday, December 29. This same scheduling conflict could occur for the Los Angeles Chargers and Los Angeles Rams, who began sharing SoFi Stadium in 2020.

Breaking ties
Often, teams will finish a season with identical records. It becomes necessary, therefore, to devise means to break these ties, either to determine which teams will qualify for the playoffs, or to determine seeding in the playoff tournament. The rules below are applied in order until the tie is broken. Ties within divisions are always broken first so to eliminate all but the highest ranked club in each division before breaking ties between teams in different divisions, however, it should be emphasized that other than for division winners, divisional ranking is not in itself a tiebreaker – for example, if a division runner-up ties with teams finishing third and fourth in another division, the runner-up's record will be compared to the team awarded third place in the other division without regard to the teams' divisional finish. 

If three or four teams in one division are tied for the division title and/or division runner-up, and also if after breaking ties within divisions three or four teams in different divisions are tied, then should the one or two team(s) be qualified or eliminated at any step the tie breaker reverts to step one for the remaining two or three teams. If multiple playoff spots are at stake, the rules are applied in order until the first team(s) qualify(ies) or is eliminated, then the process is started again for the remaining teams. Finally, once ties are broken between three or more teams qualifying for the playoffs, the relative positions of the seeds determined will not change regardless of wild card and divisional round results – for example, if division winners were to tie for the second, third and fourth seeds in a conference and the third and fourth seeds subsequently advanced to the conference championship game, the team that was originally awarded the third seed would host that game even if it would have lost a head-to-head tiebreaker against the fourth seed.

The tie-breaking rules have changed over the years, with the most recent changes being made in 2002 to accommodate the league's realignment into eight four-team divisions; record vs. common opponents and most of the other criteria involving wins and losses were moved up higher in the tie-breaking list, while those involving compiled stats such as points for and against were moved to the bottom.

The current tiebreakers are as follows, with coin tosses used if all of the criteria fail:

Overtime rules

The first postseason game to be played under these rules was the 1958 NFL Championship Game between the Baltimore Colts and New York Giants (the so-called "Greatest Game Ever Played"), decided by a one-yard touchdown run by Colts fullback Alan Ameche after eight minutes and fifteen seconds of extra time. Overtime under the original format was sudden death, the first team to score would be declared the winner.

In March , the NFL amended its rules for postseason overtime, with the rule being extended into the regular season in March 2012. If a team scores a touchdown, or if the defense scores a safety on the (other team’s) first possession, it is declared the winner. If it scores a field goal on its first possession, however, it then kicks off to the opposing team, which has an opportunity to score; if the score is tied again after that possession, true sudden death rules apply and whoever scores next will win.  True sudden death rules would continue from double overtime hereafter.

The league further amended its postseason overtime rules in March , allowing both teams to have at least one possession regardless if the first team with possession scores a touchdown.

Multiple overtimes
Since postseason games cannot end in a tie, unlike the preseason or regular season, additional overtime periods are played as necessary until a winner is determined. Furthermore, all clock rules apply as if a game had started over. Therefore, if the first overtime period ends with the score still tied, the teams switch ends of the field prior to the second overtime. If a game was still tied with two minutes to go in the second overtime, there would be a two-minute warning (but not during the first overtime period as in the regular season). If it were still tied at the end of the second overtime, the team that received the first overtime kickoff would kick off to start a third overtime period, although unlike in the first overtime period true sudden death rules would continue from the start of any third and subsequent overtime period. Although a contest could theoretically last indefinitely, or last multiple overtime periods like several National Hockey League postseason games, no NFL playoff game has ever gone past two overtime periods. The longest NFL overtime game played to date is 82 minutes, 40 seconds: Miami Dolphins kicker Garo Yepremian made the walk-off 37-yard field goal after 7:40 of the second overtime to defeat the Kansas City Chiefs, 27–24, in an AFC playoff game on December 25, 1971.

Playoff and championship history

The NFL's method for determining its champions has changed over the years.

Early years
From the league's founding in 1920 until 1932, there was no scheduled championship game. From 1920–1923, the championship was awarded to a team by a vote of team owners at the annual owners' meeting. From 1924–1932, the team having the best winning percentage was awarded the championship (the de facto standard owners had been using anyway). As each team played a different number of games, simply counting wins and losses would have been insufficient. Additionally, tie games were not counted in the standings in figuring winning percentage (under modern rules, ties count as ½ win and ½ loss). There was a head-to-head tiebreaker, which also was weighted toward the end of the season: for two teams that played each other twice, each winning once, the team winning the second game was determined to be the champion (the criteria used to decide the 1921 title).

1932 playoff game

In , the Chicago Bears (6–1–6) and the Portsmouth Spartans (6–1–4) were tied at the end of the season with identical winning percentages. Of note, the Green Bay Packers (10–3–1) had more wins, but a lower winning percentage as calculated under the rules of the day, which ignored ties. An additional game was therefore needed to determine a champion. It was agreed that the game would be played in Chicago at Wrigley Field, but severe winter weather and fear of a low turnout forced the game to be moved indoors to Chicago Stadium.

The game was played under modified rules on a shortened 80-yard dirt field, and the Bears won with a final score of 9–0. As a result of the game, the Bears had the better winning percentage and won the league title.

Before the Super Bowl

The winners of each conference (the first place teams in the conferences) met in the NFL Championship Game after the season. There was no tie-breaker system in place; any ties in the final standings of either conference resulted in playoff games in 1941, 1943, 1947, 1950 (2), 1952, 1957, 1958, and 1965. Since the venue and date of the championship game were often not known until the last game of the season had been played, these playoff games sometimes delayed the NFL title game by a week.

The playoff structure used from 1933 to 1966 was considered inequitable by some because of the number of times it failed to match the teams with the two best records in the championship game, as only the conference winners would qualify for playoff contention.

In , the NFL expanded to 16 teams and split its two conferences into two divisions of four teams each. The four division champions advanced to the playoffs, and to remain on schedule, a tie-breaker system was introduced. The first round  determined the conference's champion and its representative in the NFL Championship Game, played the following week. This was the first scheduled playoff tournament to determine the teams to play for the NFL Championship.

During the three years (1967–69) that this playoff structure was in effect, there was one use of the tie-breaker system. In 1967, the Los Angeles Rams and Baltimore Colts ended the season tied at 11–1–2 for the lead in the Coastal Division. The Colts came into the last game of the season undefeated, but were beaten by the Rams. Though the Colts shared the best win–loss record in the NFL that year, they failed to advance to the playoffs while three other teams with worse records won their divisions. This event figured into the decision in 1970 to include a wild-card team in the playoff tournament after the AFL–NFL merger.

During the 1960s, a third-place game was held in Miami, called the Playoff Bowl. It was contested in early January following the –69 seasons. Though official playoff games at the time they were played, the NFL now officially classifies these ten games (and statistics) as exhibitions, not as playoff games.

AAFC playoffs
During its brief history, the AAFC, which would merge into the NFL for the  season, used an identical playoff format to the NFL from 1946 to 1948. In 1949 (its last year), the AAFC merged its two conferences when one of its teams folded, and used a four-team playoff system. In 1948, the aforementioned issue of playoff inequity came into play when the San Francisco 49ers would miss the playoffs with a 12–2 record; they were in the same conference as the 14–0 Cleveland Browns, who would go on to win the Western Conference and then the AAFC's championship game against the 7–7 Buffalo Bills (AAFC).

AFL playoffs

For the 1960–68 seasons, the AFL used the two-divisional format identical to the NFL to determine its champion. There was no tie-breaker system in place, so ties atop the Eastern Division final standings in 1963 and Western Division in 1968 necessitated playoff games to determine each division's representative in the championship. In both years, the playoff winner went on the road for the AFL title game and lost.

For 1969, the final season before its merger with the NFL, the AFL added a first round whereby each division winner played the second-place team from the other division. The winners of these games met in the AFL Championship Game. In the only year of this format, the AFL champion Kansas City Chiefs were the second-place team in the Western division and played both games on the road. They won Super Bowl IV in January and became the first division runner-up to win a Super Bowl.

Super Bowl and merger
The Super Bowl began as an inter-league championship game between the AFL and NFL, an idea first proposed by Kansas City Chiefs owner Lamar Hunt. This compromise was the result of pressures the upstart AFL was placing on the older NFL. The success of the rival league eventually led to a full merger of the two leagues.

From the 1966 season to the 1969 season (Super Bowls I–IV) the game featured the champions of the AFL and NFL. Since the 1970 season, the game has featured the champions of the National Football Conference (NFC) and the American Football Conference (AFC).

When the leagues merged in 1970, the new NFL (with 26 teams) reorganized into two conferences of three divisions each. From the 1970 season to the 1977 season, four teams from each conference (for a total of eight teams) qualified for the playoffs each year. These four teams included the three division champions, and a fourth wild-card team.

Originally, the home teams in the playoffs were decided based on a yearly rotation. From 1970 to 1974, the divisional playoff round rotated which of the three division champions have home-field advantage, with the wild-card teams and their opponents they faced in the divisional playoff game will never get it. Starting in 1970, the divisional playoff games consisted of the AFC Central champions and the NFC West champions playing their games on the road. Then in 1971 it rotated to the AFC East champions and the NFC East champions playing their games on the road. In the 1972 divisional playoff games, the AFC West champions and the NFC Central champions were the visiting teams. And 1973 it would start all over with the AFC Central and NFC West again, and so on.

The rotation system led to several playoff inequities, such as:
 In 1971, the teams with the two best records in each conference met in the divisional round. Meanwhile, the wild card teams had better records than the division winners they faced (the Browns and 49ers were both 9–5). 
 In 1972, the Dolphins had to take their perfect record to Three Rivers Stadium to face the Pittsburgh Steelers, who went 11–3, in the AFC championship game.
 In 1973, the 10–4 Bengals had to play at the 12–2 Dolphins in the divisional round, while the 9–4–1 Raiders hosted the wild card Steelers. 
 In 1973, the Cowboys finished 10–4 but hosted two 12–2 teams, the Los Angeles Rams and Minnesota.
 In 1974, the 11–3 Dolphins had to play at the 12–2 Raiders in the divisional round, while the 10–3–1 Steelers hosted the wild card Bills. 
 In 1974, the Vikings hosted the Rams in the NFC championship even though both teams went 10–4 and Los Angeles defeated Minnesota in the regular season. 

The league instituted a seeding system for the playoffs in 1975, where the surviving clubs with the higher seeds were made the home teams for each playoff round. Thus, the top seeded division winner played the wild-card team, and the remaining two division winners played at the home stadium of the better seed, forcing the worst-ranked division winner to open the postseason on the road. However, two teams from the same division could not meet prior to the conference championship game. Thus, there would be times when the pairing in the divisional playoff round would be the 1 seed vs. the 3 seed and 2 vs. 4.

Expansion
The two wild-card teams played the week before the division winners. The winner of this game played the top seeded division winner as was done from 1970–1977. The league continued to prohibit intra-divisional games in the divisional playoffs, but allowed such contests in the wild-card round. This ten-team playoff format was used through the 1989 season. Under this system, the Oakland Raiders became the first wild-card team to win a Super Bowl following the 1980 season.

During the strike-shortened  season, only nine regular season games were played, and a modified playoff format was instituted. Divisional play was ignored (there were some cases where division rivals had both games wiped out by the strike, although each division ultimately sent at least one team to the playoffs), and the top eight teams from each conference (based on W-L-T record) were advanced to the playoffs. As a result, this became the first time that teams with losing records qualified for the playoffs: the 4–5 Cleveland Browns and the 4–5 Detroit Lions.

Several times between 1978–89, the two wild-card games had to be played on different days. Normally they both would be held on Sunday. In 1983 and 1988, the games were split between Saturday and Monday because Sunday was Christmas, and the NFL had avoided playing on that day at the time. In 1984, both games were played in the Pacific Time Zone, so they had to be played on Saturday and Sunday to accommodate for time differences. In 1985, both the New York Giants and Jets hosted wild-card games. As they have shared a home stadium since 1984, the games had to be played on different days.

For the 1990 season, a third wild-card team for each conference was added, expanding the playoffs to twelve teams. The lowest-seeded division winner was then "demoted" to the wild-card weekend. Also, the restrictions on intra-divisional games during the divisional playoffs were removed.

The  season was the first with playoff games in prime time. Thus, the league no longer had the same restrictions like in 1984 as to when to schedule games in the Pacific Time Zone.

The 1990 format continued until the 2002 expansion and realignment into eight divisions. In this format, used until the 2019 season, the four division winners and two wild cards in both conferences are seeded 1–6, respectively, with the top two seeds receiving byes, and the highest seed in each round guaranteed to host the lowest seed.

A limitation of the 12-team format was that division winners, including one with a .500 regular season record or a losing season, could play a home playoff game against wild card teams who had superior regular season records. Home field advantage does not guarantee success, however; during the 2015–16 season, every road team won their respective Wild Card playoff game, the first such occurrence in NFL history. Through 2019 however, NFL owners remained adamant that every division winner should still be rewarded with a home playoff game regardless of record.

Calls to expand the playoffs to 14 teams began in 2006. Proponents of expansion noted the increased revenue that could be gained from an additional two playoff games. They also noted that the 12-team playoff system was implemented when the league still had 28 teams, four fewer than the 2002 expansion. The opposition to such a move notes that an expansion of the playoffs would "water down" the field by giving access to lower-caliber teams. Opponents to expansion further point to the NBA playoffs and the NHL playoffs where more than half of the teams qualify for the postseason, and there is often a decreased emphasis on regular season performance as a result. In October 2013, NFL commissioner Roger Goodell announced plans to revisit the idea to expand the playoffs to 14 teams, with the increased revenue gained from the two additional postseason games being used to offset plans to shorten the preseason. The 14-team playoff proposal remained tabled until December 2014, when no team in the NFC South could finish better than .500; Goodell stated that the league would vote on it at the March 2015 Owners' Meetings. However, by February 2015, the Washington Post reported that support among team owners had eroded, and league leaders expressed reluctance to make a change until the end of the 2015 season. The proposal then lost all interest by 2017.

The league eventually revisited and implemented the 14-team playoff format in 2020, placing a third wild-card team in each conference, and only giving the top seed a bye (as explained above).

NFL playoff appearances

Correct as of end of the 2022 regular season (including 2022–23 playoff berths).

Appearances by active teams

Current playoff appearance streaks
 Bold italics including longest streak indicates that the streak is also the team's longest-ever streak for consecutive playoff seasons.

Breakdown by division

All-time streaks of accomplishment
Notable current streaks in table are listed below in bold. Only the longest streak for each team is listed. Note that the regular season increased from 14 to 16 games in 1978, and teams only played 9 regular-season games in 1982.

All streaks can be verified on the team pages at Pro-Football-Reference.com.

Most consecutive playoff appearances all time

{|class="wikitable" style="text-align:center"
! colspan="30"  style="width:95%; text-align:center; font-size:125%; background:#deb887;"| Teams' longest consecutive playoff appearances all time
|- style="background:#f0f0f0;"
| colspan="4"  style="width:16%; border-right:2px solid blue;"|1990s
| colspan="10"  style="width:16%; border-right:2px solid blue;"|2000s
| colspan="10"  style="width:16%; border-right:2px solid blue;"|2010s
| colspan="6" style="width:8%;"|2020s
|- style="background:#f0f0f0;"
|width=2%|6||width=2%|7||width=2%|8|| style="width:2%; border-right:2px solid blue;"|9
|width=2%|0||width=2%|1||width=2%|2||width=2%|3||width=2%|4||width=2%|5||width=2%|6||width=2%|7||width=2%|8|| style="width:2%; border-right:2px solid blue;"|9
|width=2%|0||width=2%|1||width=2%|2||width=2%|3||width=2%|4||width=2%|5||width=2%|6||width=2%|7||width=2%|8|| style="width:2%; border-right:2px solid blue;"|9
|width=2%|0||width=2%|1||width=2%|2||width=2%|3||width=2%|4||width=2%|5
|- style="background:#e0e0e0;"
|colspan= 6 | || colspan="9" style="background:#003b7b"|Indianapolis Colts 9 ||colspan="5" style="background:#FB4F14;color: black"| Cincinnati Bengals 5||colspan="10" style="border-bottom: 3px solid silver"|
|- style="background:#e0e0e0;"
|colspan=4 style="border: 3px solid #E5B73B;background:#00827F;" |Jacksonville Jaguars 4|| colspan="5" style="border: 3px solid silver;background:#003b48"|Philadelphia Eagles 5 ||colspan=4 style="border: 3px solid red;background:#192f6b;" | New York Giants 4||colspan="8" style="border: 3px solid #FFEF00;background:#213D30" | Green Bay Packers 8||colspan=9 |
|- style="background:#e0e0e0;"
|colspan= 3 style="border-bottom: 3px solid silver"| ||colspan=4 style="border: 3px solid #CCCCFF;background-color:#C41E3A" |Tampa Bay Bucs 4 || colspan="6"| || colspan="11" style="background:#192f6b;" |  New England Patriots 11 ||colspan= 6|
|- style="background:#e0e0e0;"
|colspan=10 style="border: 3px solid silver"| ||colspan=4 style="border: 3px solid #D4AF37;background:#062A78;"| San Diego Chargers 4|| colspan=5|  || colspan="8" style="background:#cfecec;"|Kansas City Chiefs 8||colspan=3| 
|- style="background:#e0e0e0;"
| || colspan="5" style="border: 3px solid #FF7F00;background:#00A693"|Miami Dolphins 5|| colspan="6"| || colspan="5" style="background:#200080;" |Baltimore Ravens 5 || style=";" colspan=3 |Carolina Panthers 3||colspan=10|
|- style="background:#e0e0e0;"
| colspan=5 style="border: 3px solid silver"|  ||colspan=2 style="background:#0C371D" | NY Jets 2||colspan=6| ||colspan=2 style="background:#0C371D" | NY Jets 2 ||colspan=5 style="background:#FB4F14;color: black"| Denver Broncos 5 ||colspan=10|
|- style="background:#e0e0e0;"
|colspan=12 style="border: 3px solid silver"| ||colspan=2 style="background:#a02040" | Az Cards 2||colspan="3" style="border: 3px solid #000000;background-color: #c02020"|Atlanta Falcons 3 ||  ||colspan=2 style="background:#a02040" | Az Cards 2||colspan=10 |
|- style="background:#e0e0e0;"
|colspan= 7| ||  colspan="5"  style="border: 3px solid #69BE28;background-color:#002244" |Seattle Seahawks 5|| colspan=4 | || colspan="5"  style="background-color:#002244" |Seattle Seahawks 5|| colspan="4" style=";" |  New Orleans Saints 4   ||colspan= 5|
|- style="background:#e0e0e0;"
|colspan=15 |  ||colspan=2 style="border: 3px solid #191970;background:#C41E3A;color:white" |  Texans 2 || colspan= 2| ||colspan=2 style="background:#C41E3A;color:white" |  Texans 2 || style="border-bottom: 3px solid silver"|   ||colspan=2 style="background:#C41E3A;color:white" |  Texans 2  ||colspan= 6|
|- style="background:#f0f0f0;"
|width=2%|6||width=2%|7||width=2%|8||  style="width:2%; border-right:2px solid blue;"|9
|width=2%|0||width=2%|1||width=2%|2||width=2%|3||width=2%|4||width=2%|5||width=2%|6||width=2%|7||width=2%|8||  style="width:2%; border-right:2px solid blue;"|9
|width=2%|0||width=2%|1||width=2%|2||width=2%|3||width=2%|4||width=2%|5||width=2%|6||width=2%|7||width=2%|8||  style="width:2%; border-right:2px solid blue;"|9
|width=2%|0||width=2%|1||width=2%|2||width=2%|3||width=2%|4||width=2%|5
|- style="background:#f0f0f0;"
| colspan="4"  style="width:16%; border-right:2px solid blue;"|1990s
| colspan="10"  style="width:16%; border-right:2px solid blue;"|2000s
| colspan="10"  style="width:16%; border-right:2px solid blue;"|2010s
| colspan="6"  style="width:10%;"|2020s
|}

 11 seasons: New England Patriots 2009–19
 9 seasons: Dallas Cowboys 1975–83, Indianapolis Colts 2002–10
 8 seasons: Pittsburgh Steelers 1972–79, Los Angeles Rams 1973–80, San Francisco 49ers 1983–90,  Green Bay Packers 2009–16
 7 seasons: Houston Oilers 1987–93, Kansas City Chiefs 2015–21 6 seasons: Cleveland Browns 1950–55, Oakland Raiders 1972–77, Minnesota Vikings 1973–78, Buffalo Bills 1988–93
 5 seasons: Miami Dolphins (1970–74, 1981–85, 1997–2001), Chicago Bears 1984–88, Philadelphia Eagles 2000–04, Seattle Seahawks (2003–07, 2012–16), Baltimore Ravens 2008–12, Cincinnati Bengals 2011–15, Denver Broncos 2011–15
 4 seasons: Washington Redskins 1971–75, San Diego Chargers (1979–82, 2006–09), Jacksonville Jaguars 1996–99, Tampa Bay Buccaneers 1999–2002, New York Giants 2005–08, New Orleans Saints 2017–20
 3 seasons: Detroit Lions (1952–54, 1993–95), Atlanta Falcons 2010–12, Carolina Panthers 2013–15
 2 seasons: Arizona Cardinals (1947–48, 1974–75, 2008–09, 2014–15), New York Jets (1968–69, 1981–82, 1985–86, 2001–02, 2009–10), Houston Texans (2011–12, 2015–16, 2018–19)

Longest consecutive streak with a playoff win
Streaks can be verified at Pro Football Reference.com Team Franchise Pages

 8 seasons: New England Patriots 2011–18
 6 seasons: Dallas Cowboys 1991–96
 5 seasons: Oakland Raiders 1973–77, Green Bay Packers 1993–97, Philadelphia Eagles 2000–04, Baltimore Ravens 2008–12,  Seattle Seahawks 2012–16, Kansas City Chiefs 2018–22 4 seasons: Buffalo Bills 1990–93, Pittsburgh Steelers 1994–97, Minnesota Vikings 1997–2000
 3 seasons: Miami Dolphins (1971–73, 1998–2000), Los Angeles Rams 1974–76, San Diego Chargers 1980–82, New York Giants 1984–86, San Francisco 49ers (1998–90, 1992–94, 1996–98, 2011–13), Washington Redskins 1990–92
 2 seasons: Chicago Bears (1940–41, 1984–85), Detroit Lions 1952–53, Cleveland Browns (1954–55, 1986–87), Baltimore Colts (1958–59, 1970–71, 2003–04, 2013–14), Houston Oilers/ Tennessee Titans (1960–61, 1978–79, 1987–88, 2002–03), Denver Broncos (1986–87, 1997–98), Jacksonville Jaguars 1998–99, Arizona Cardinals 2008–09, New York Jets 2009–10, Houston Texans 2011–12, Carolina Panthers 2014–15, Atlanta Falcons 2016–17, New Orleans Saints 2017–18, Tampa Bay Buccaneers 2020–21, Cincinnati Bengals 2021-22'''

See also
 List of NFL playoff games
 National Football League championships
 NFL playoff results
 NFL starting quarterback playoff records

References

Further reading

External links
 Super Bowl History
 Pro-Football-Reference.com – Large online database of NFL data and statistics. Many of the game scores and records in this article can be found there.